Chef to Go is a Philippine television cooking show broadcast by Q. Hosted by Rob Pengson in the first and third season and Marvin Agustin in the second season, it premiered on August 5, 2007. The show concluded in 2009.

Accolades
 New York Festival 2009

2007 Philippine television series debuts
2009 Philippine television series endings
Filipino-language television shows
Philippine cooking television series
Q (TV network) original programming